WOGK (93.7 FM), known as "K-Country", is a commercial radio station in Ocala, Florida, broadcasting to the Gainesville-Ocala, Florida area on 93.7 MHz. The station can also be heard as far as Lakeland, Orlando and Jacksonville.

History
The station began operations in 1960 as WMOP-FM, a 4,200-watt MOR music station. Owner James Kirk instituted major changes in 1973, including changing the calls to WFUZ, increasing the effective radiated power to 100,000 watts, and installing a beautiful music/easy listening format, with big band shows hosted by the legendary "Big Daddy" Miles Foland. WFUZ eventually added evening country music programming in the early 1980s, in response to the growing popularity of competitor WTRS.

In 1985, James Kirk sold WFUZ to Dix Communications, which dumped the evening country programming and converted WFUZ to a full-time adult contemporary format.  Then in 1986, changed the station's format to CHR/Top 40 as WMMZ ("Z93"), putting the station in competition with top-rated WYKS "Kiss 105." After a successful eight-year run as "Z93", 93.7 FM changed to its current calls and format in 1994.

WOGK is currently the market's most-listened-to radio station and is beating its country rivals (including the University of Florida's WRUF-FM) by wide margins.

Effective December 31, 2018, Dix Communications sold WOGK to Saga Communications for $9.3 million, along with sister stations WNDD, WNDN, and WNDT.

External links
WOGK official website

OGK
Country radio stations in the United States
Radio stations established in 1960
1960 establishments in Florida